Gary Boswell (born June 19, 1954) is an American politician from Kentucky. He is a Republican who has represented District 8 in the Kentucky Senate since January 1, 2023. He is also a farmer and real estate developer in Owensboro, Kentucky.

References 

1954 births
21st-century American politicians
Living people
Republican Party Kentucky state senators